Anthony Abdy may refer to:

Anthony Abdy (1579–1640), English East India merchant
Sir Anthony Abdy, 2nd Baronet (1655–1704), of the Abdy baronets
Sir Anthony Abdy, 3rd Baronet (1688–1733), of the Abdy baronets
Sir Anthony Abdy, 5th Baronet (  1720–1775), British lawyer and MP for Knaresborough
Anthony Abdy (cricketer) (1856–1924), British cricketer for Essex and Hampshire

See also
Abdy (surname)